Roberto Tamburini (born 15 January 1991 in Rimini) is an Italian motorcycle racer. For 2022 he was a late addition to the 2022 Superbike World Championship, entered as riding for a one-bike Motoxracing Yamaha team.

Tamburini has competed in the European Superstock 1000 Championship and the CIV Superbike Championship aboard an BMW S1000RR. He has previously competed in the 125cc class of the Grand Prix Motorcycle World Championship. In 2010 he raced full-time in the Supersport class of the Italian national championship (CIV), winning the title by 4 points. He also took part in some World Supersport races, the Coppa Italia Yamaha R6 Cup, the Italian Superstock 600 Championship and the Supersport World Championship.

Career
Tamburini made his Supersport World Championship debut in the 2010 Misano round, taking 3rd on the grid and 5th place in his first race in the championship, missed the next round but returned in the Silverstone round. He qualified 4th on the grid, after a good start at the first corner he was clipped by championship challenger Joan Lascorz, causing Tamburini to be catapulted off his bike and into the fence between Copse and Maggotts corners.

Tamburini was lucky to have only broken a collar bone, Lascorz also suffered a concussion in the accident. He returned for the last three races, scoring three 9th places. With 5 races in total, he finished the championship in 14th position with 32 points. He decided to join the Supersport World Championship full-time in 2011, he remained with his team that he won the Italian CIV Supersport with; Bike Servie R.T aboard a Yamaha YZF-R6. He finished the season in 9th overall with a best result of 4th at Silverstone. He joined Team Lorini for the 2012 Supersport World Championship season and rode a Honda CBR600R, he finished 12th in the standings with two 4th places at Imola and Misano. He left Team Lorini and signed to race for Suriano Racing Team to ride a Suzuki GSX-R600 for the 2013 season. He left the team after the Monza round and later re joined Team Lorini to ride a Honda again from the Moscow round onwards.

Career statistics

Grand Prix motorcycle racing

By season

Races by year

Supersport World Championship

By season

Races by year
(key) (Races in bold indicate pole position; races in italics indicate fastest lap)

Superbike World Championship

By season

Races by year
(key) (Races in bold indicate pole position) (Races in italics indicate fastest lap)

* Season still in progress.

References

External links
Profile on MotoGP.com
Profile on WorldSBK.com

1991 births
Living people
Italian motorcycle racers
125cc World Championship riders
Supersport World Championship riders
Sportspeople from Rimini
FIM Superstock 1000 Cup riders
Superbike World Championship riders